There Were Days... and Moons is a 1990 film directed by Claude Lelouch, in the style of a Greek tragedy, with inextricably interconnected characters fated for violence and social alienation.

Cast and roles
 Gérard Lanvin - Truck driver
 Patrick Chesnais - Doctor
 Annie Girardot - Lone woman
 Marie-Sophie L. - Sophie
 Francis Huster - Priest
 Vincent Lindon - Innkeeper
 Philippe Léotard - Singer
 Jean-Claude Dreyfus - Accident's man
 Gérard Darmon - Moody policeman
 Paul Préboist - Retired man
 Serge Reggiani - Sophie's father
 Véronique Silver - Sophie's mother
 Christine Boisson - Innkeeper's wife
 Charles Gérard - Cook
 Michel Creton - Man with knife
 Claire Nadeau - Cheated woman
 Caroline Micla - Bride
 Jacques Gamblin - Husband
 Amidou - Incredulous policeman

External links

1990 films
French drama films
Films directed by Claude Lelouch
Films scored by Francis Lai
1990s French films